Raghubar Dayal Misra was an Indian politician He was elected to the Lok Sabha, lower house of the Parliament of India as a member of the Indian National Congress. He and K.L. Balmiki were the 1st Lok Sabha MP from Bulandshahr.

References

External links
 Official biographical sketch in Lok Sabha website

India MPs 1952–1957
India MPs 1957–1962
Lok Sabha members from Uttar Pradesh
1898 births
Year of death missing